Puha or Püha may refer to:

Sonchus, genus of annual herbs (sow thistles)
Puha, New Zealand, a settlement in New Zealand's North Island
Püha, Harju County, village in Saue Parish, Harju County, Estonia
Püha, Saare County, village in Pihtla Parish, Saare County, Estonia
Puha, genus of extinct sea snails in the family Raphitomidae